"Happy New Year" is a song by Swedish group ABBA from their 1980 album Super Trouper, with lead vocals by Agnetha Fältskog. It originally had a very limited release as a single in December of that year. The song's working title was "Daddy Don't Get Drunk on Christmas Day".

The Spanish-language version of the song, "", was released in 1980 in Spanish-speaking territories. The single reportedly charted in the top 5 in Argentina and was included on the South American versions of the Super Trouper album.

In 1999, the English version of the song was re-released for the new millennium, and charted at number 27 in Sweden, number 15 in the Netherlands and number 75 in Germany.

In 2008, it was released again in several countries, and charted at number 4 in Sweden, number 11 in Norway and number 25 in Denmark. It re-entered the Swedish and Norwegian charts in 2009 at number 5 in both charts and number 8 in the Netherlands in 2011. It has since gone on to regularly chart in some countries upon the turn of the new year. The song also became a staple of the new year (and Lunar New Year) period in Vietnam.

In December 2011, a silver glitter vinyl single limited to 500 copies was released, including the songs "Happy New Year" and "The Way Old Friends Do". The edition was available exclusively from the official ABBA site and the ABBA fan site. It was sold out within a day of the release being announced.

Upon the release of ABBA: The 40th Anniversary Singles Box Set on 5 May 2014, an alternate mix of "Andante, Andante" was revealed to have been used on the B-side of the single in the boxset instead of the original album version.

In 2022 is was the 32nd top best selling vinyl single in the UK behind Open The FloodGates by Smile.

A-Teens version

The song was covered by the A-Teens, and released as a single in 1999. The single was released to celebrate the arrival of the new millennium: thus, the last line in the song's third verse is altered to "in the end of ninety-nine", as opposed to the original's "in the end of eighty-nine". It reached number 4 on the Swedish charts, becoming the band's fourth consecutive top ten in the country and earning a Gold certification weeks after its release. The single was only released in selected countries, including Chile, after their visit there in February 2000. A music video was made to support the single's release.

Track listing
Scandinavian 2-Track CD single
"Happy New Year" [Radio version] – 4:24
"Happy New Year" [Extended version] – 6:52

Scandinavian CD Maxi
"Happy New Year" [Radio version] – 4:24
"Happy New Year" [Extended version] – 6:52
"Mamma Mia" [The Bold & the Beautiful Glamourmix Edit] – 3:46
"Super Trouper" [W.I.P.] – 6:10

Charts

ABBA version

A-Teens version

Lova version

Year-end charts

|}

Certifications

References

1980 singles
1980 songs
2000 singles
ABBA songs
A-Teens songs
Epic Records singles
Music videos directed by Lasse Hallström
New Year songs
Songs written by Benny Andersson and Björn Ulvaeus
Universal Music Group singles